Sandusky Township, Ohio may refer to:

 Sandusky Township, Crawford County, Ohio
 Sandusky Township, Richland County, Ohio
 Sandusky Township, Sandusky County, Ohio

Ohio township disambiguation pages